Fenghuang Township is a township in Bama Yao Autonomous County, Guangxi, China.

Etymology
The township is named "Fenghuang" (Phoenix) because there is a mountain in the township which looks like a phoenix.

Administrative division
As of 2016, the township is divided into four villages: 
 Changhe
 Dena
 Fenghuang
 Nazhao

Geography
The township is situated at the eastern Bama Yao Autonomous County. It is bordered to the north by Donglan County, to the east by Dongshan Township and Dahua Yao Autonomous County, to the south by Dahua Yao Autonomous County, and to the west by Bama Town.

Economy
The region's economy is based on agriculture. The main crops of the region are grains, followed by sugarcane and beans. The Bama miniature pig is a local specialty pig.

Transportation
The China National Highway 323 passes across the township southwest to north.

References

Bibliography
 

Townships of Hechi
Divisions of Bama Yao Autonomous County